Hanahan is a city in Berkeley County, South Carolina, United States. The population was 12,937 at the 2000 census. The 2010 census puts the population at 17,997. Portions of the Naval Weapons Station Charleston, including the Naval Consolidated Brig Charleston, are located in Hanahan. As defined by the U.S. Office of Management and Budget, and used by the U.S. Census Bureau for statistical purposes only, Hanahan is included within the Charleston-North Charleston-Summerville metropolitan area and the Charleston-North Charleston Urbanized Area

Geography

Hanahan is located at the very south end of Berkeley County, and its city limits on the west and south sides are contiguous with the county line between Berkeley and Charleston counties. It was incorporated as a city in 1973.

Hanahan is bordered on the west and south by the city of North Charleston. To the east is the old Naval Weapons Station, which was formerly a submarine base, and is still federal property. A very small portion of this federal base is actually in Hanahan's city limits. Among other uses of the former submarine base, the Naval Consolidated Brig is there, as is the Navy's Nuclear Power School. To the east and north is the city of Goose Creek, as well as unincorporated portions of Berkeley County.

CSX Transportation has a main north-south track that runs along Hanahan's west city limit. Hanahan is primarily a residential city. It does have quite a number of major warehouses in the northeast and southeast portions of the city, most of whose business is tied directly to the Port of Charleston, aeronautics, logistics and the defense industries. There are two commercial districts, one in the southernmost section of the city and another in Tanner Plantation. There has been some commercial development in the area known as Tanner Plantation, a primarily residential portion of the city which has developed over about the last 15 years. Hanahan's proximity to rail and major roadways make it an ideal place for cargo warehousing.

The Otranto Plantation was listed on the National Register of Historic Places in 1978.

Demographics

With a population of 19,597, Hanahan is a growing city.

2020 census

As of the 2020 United States census, there were 20,325 people, 8,891 households, and 6,031 families residing in the city.

2000 census
In the census of 2000, there were 12,937 people (13,818 in 2005 estimate), 5,243 households, and 3,339 families residing in the city. The population density was 1,284.7 people per square mile (496.0/km2). There were 5,698 housing units at an average density of 565.8 per square mile (218.5/km2). The racial makeup of the city was 70.6% White, 17.7% African American, 0.4% Native American, 2.0% Asian, 0.1% Pacific Islander, 0.3% from other races, and 1.9% from two or more races. Hispanic or Latino of any race were 6.17% of the population.

There were 5,243 households, out of which 27.9% have youngsters under age 18 years living with them, 46.1% were married couples living together, 13.1% had a female householder with no husband present, and 36.3% were non-families. 27.7% of all households were made up of individuals, and 7.4% had someone living alone who was 65 years of age or older. The average household size was 2.34 and the average family size was 2.84.

In the city, the population was spread out, with 21.0% under the age of 18, 13.8% from 18 to 24, 31.5% from 25 to 44, 22.2% from 45 to 64, and 11.5% who were 65 years of age or older. The median age was 35 years. For every 100 females, there were 112.4 males. For every 100 females age 18 and over, there were 113.0 males.

The median income for a household in the city was $39,327, and the median income for a family was $45,246. Males had a median income of $30,354 versus $22,374 for females. The per capita income for the city was $22,629. About 6.0% of families and 17.4% of the population were below the poverty line, including 10.9% of those under age 18 and 6.2% of those age 65 or over.

Government and infrastructure
The form of government is council. The council is the governing body of the city, with the city administrator being hired by, and serving at the pleasure of, the city council. The council and mayor are elected by the voters. The mayor is a first among equals on the council, presiding over council meetings and representing the city at official functions. The council hires and fires department heads. The mayor and council members, though paid a small salary, are not full-time, but are citizens with other jobs.

The Hanahan Fire Department operates three stations. Station 1 is located at 5826 Campbell Street, Station 2 is located at 1200 S. Basilica Avenue, and Station 3 is located at 1101 Williams Lane in the fast-growing Tanner Plantation area. The department operates two engine companies, one tower company, one medic unit, and one battalion officer vehicle manned by the shift officer.

The Hanahan Police Department operates a 40-person Department complete with a dispatch center, animal control officers, community service officer, community youth officer and two School Resource Officers.  The patrol division operates on four, twelve hour shifts with a Sergeant and a Corporal overseeing the operations of each shift.

Portions of the Naval Weapons Station Charleston, including the Naval Consolidated Brig Charleston, are located in Hanahan.

Armed Forces
Portions of The Charleston, South Carolina metropolitan area, (The City of Charleston, The City of North Charleston, The City of Goose Creek, and The City of Hanahan) are home to branches of the United States Military.  During the Cold War, the Naval Base (1902–1996) became the third largest U.S. homeport serving over 80 ships and submarines.  In addition, the Charleston Naval Shipyard repaired frigates, destroyers, cruisers, sub tenders, and submarines.  The Shipyard was also equipped for the refueling of nuclear subs.

During this period, the Weapons Station was the Atlantic Fleet's load out base for all nuclear ballistic missile submarines.  Two SSBN "Boomer" squadrons and a sub tender were homeported at the Weapons Station, while one SSN attack squadron, Submarine Squadron 4, and a sub tender were homeported at the Naval Base.  At the 1996 closure of the Station's Polaris Missile Facility Atlantic (POMFLANT), over 2,500 nuclear warheads and their UGM-27 Polaris, UGM-73 Poseidon, and UGM-96 Trident I delivery missiles (SLBM) were stored and maintained, guarded by a U.S. Marine Corps Security Force Company.

In 2010, the Air Force Base (3,877 acres) and Naval Weapons Station (>17,000 acres) merged to form Joint Base Charleston.  Today, Joint Base Charleston, encompassing over 20,877 acres and supporting 53 Military Commands and Federal Agencies, provides service to over 79,000 Airmen, Sailors, Soldiers, Marines, Coast Guardsmen, DOD civilians, dependents, and retirees.

Navy 
Naval Weapons Station, Joint Base Charleston (>17,000 acres, 27 square miles), Goose Creek and Hanahan
Naval Information Warfare Center Atlantic (NAVWAR)
Naval Nuclear Power Training Command
Nuclear Power School
Nuclear Power Training Unit
Moored Training Nuclear Submarine, 
Moored Training Nuclear Submarine, 
Moored Training Nuclear Submarine, After 2018 delivery
Moored Training Nuclear Submarine, After 2019 delivery
Naval Consolidated Brig, Charleston, East Coast
Mobile Mine Assembly Unit Eleven (MOMAU-11)
Naval Operations Support Center Charleston
Navy Reserve Center
Navy Munitions Command CONUS, Detachment Charleston
Explosive Ordnance Detachment
Naval Health Clinic Charleston
Navy Dental Clinic
Naval Criminal Investigative Service Training, Federal Complex
Lay berth for Roll-On Roll-Off Naval Ships, Military Sealift Command, Federal Complex
, Military Sealift Command Ship, Ready Reserve Force, Federal Complex
MV Cape Douglas (T-AKR-5052), Military Sealift Command Ship, Ready Reserve Force, Federal Complex
MV Cape Domingo (T-AKR-5053), Military Sealift Command Ship, Ready Reserve Force, Federal Complex
MV Cape Decision (T-AKR-5054), Military Sealift Command Ship, Ready Reserve Force, Federal Complex
MV Cape Diamond (T-AKR-5055), Military Sealift Command Ship, Ready Reserve Force, Federal Complex
MV Cape Edmont (T-AKR-5069),  Military Sealift Command Ship, Ready Reserve Force, Federal Complex

Air Force 
Charleston Air Force Base, Joint Base Charleston (3,877 acres, 6.06 square miles), North Charleston
Charleston Air Force Auxiliary Base, North, SC (2,393 acres, 3.74 square miles)
Charleston Defense Fuel Storage and Distribution Facility, Hanahan  
628th Air Base Wing
628th Mission Support Group
628th Medical Group
315th Airlift Wing
437th Airlift Wing
373rd Training Squadron, Detachment 5
1st Combat Camera Squadron
412th Logistics Support Squadron OL-AC 
Air Force ROTC Det 772
Civil Air Patrol – Charleston Composite Squadron

Marines 
Marine Corps Reserve Center, Naval Weapons Station

Coast Guard 
Coast Guard Sector Charleston (District 7)
Coast Guard Station Charleston
Coast Guard Helicopter Air Facility, Johns Island
Coast Guard Eurocopter HH-65 Dolphin, Johns Island
Coast Guard Reserves, Charleston
Coast Guard Maritime Law Enforcement Academy, Federal Complex
 National Security Cutter, Federal Complex
 National Security Cutter, Federal Complex
 National Security Cutter, 2021 Delivery, Federal Complex
USCGC Tarpon, Marine Protector-class coastal patrol boat, Tybee Island
USCGC Yellowfin, Marine Protector-class coastal patrol boat, Charleston
USCGC Anvil, Charleston

Army 
United States Army Corps of Engineers, Charleston District
South Carolina Army National Guard
Army Reserve Training Center, Naval Weapons Station
841st Army Transportation Battalion, Naval Weapons Station
1182nd Army Deployment & Distribution Support Battalion, Naval Weapons Station 
1189th Army Transportation Brigade, Reserve Support Command, Naval Weapons Station
Army Strategic Logistics Activity, Naval Weapons Station

Federal Complex (former Charleston Naval Base), North Charleston 
Federal Law Enforcement Training Centers (FLETC), Department of Homeland Security
Moored FLETC Training Ship, SS Cape Chalmers (T-AK-5036)
Sea Hawk Interagency Operations Center
Customs and Border Protection Satellite Academy
Immigration and Customs Enforcement Satellite Academy
U.S. Courts, Federal Probation and Pretrial Services Academy
Food and Drug Administration Training Academy
National Oceanic and Atmospheric Administration (NOAA)
NOAAS Nancy Foster (R 352) Ship
NOAAS Ronald H. Brown (R 104) Ship
U.S. Department of State
Global Financial Services Center, U.S. Department of State
Passport Service Center, U.S. Department of State
United States Maritime Administration

Education
Hanahan has three public schools for school aged children. Hanahan Elementary and Hanahan Middle School were both awarded National Blue Ribbon Award status by the U.S. Department of Education in 2014.  Out of 5 schools in the entire state, Hanahan has two of them. Hanahan also continues to cultivate some of the best softball and baseball players in the state. Both the 9- and 11-year-old girls team won the Dixie Ponytails World Series Softball Championship in 2013  as well as the Dixie Angles World Series Softball Championship.

Hanahan has a public library, a branch of the Berkeley County Library System.

Arts and culture
Yeamans Hall Club is located in Hanahan. Yeamans is ranked the #2 private course in the State of South Carolina. and was built in 1925.

Fishing and water sports are a large part of life in Hanahan. With several neighborhoods that have tidal water behind them, Hanahan has direct access to the Cooper River and the Charleston Harbor. Fishing is a very popular thing to do in Hanahan. The Goose Creek Reservoir is located in the middle of Hanahan. The Reservoir contains a wide range of fish species and hosts several tournaments per year.

Opened in 2013, the Hanahan Amphitheater is an outdoor community theater that hosts city run events, movies in the park and concerts.  The Amphitheater is complete with concessions, setup for professional audio/video events and host weddings and other community events.

References

External links

City of Hanahan official website
 
 Patriots Point Naval & Maritime Museum
 Congressional Medal of Honor Museum
 USS Yorktown CV10 Association

Cities in South Carolina
Cities in Berkeley County, South Carolina
Charleston–North Charleston–Summerville metropolitan area
Populated places established in 1972